Martyn Ridyard (born 25 July 1986) is an English professional rugby league footballer who plays as a goal-kicking  or  for Oldham in the RFL League 1.

He played for the Leigh Centurions in two separate spells in the Championship and the Super League, and on loan from Leigh at the Huddersfield Giants in the Super League and the Rochdale Hornets in the Championship. Ridyard has also played for Featherstone Rovers in the second tier.

Background
Ridyard was born in Salford, Greater Manchester, England.

Career

Early career
Ridyard came through the junior ranks at Leigh Miners, joining Leigh academy squad upon leaving school before returning to Leigh Miners. There he helped Miners win the 2004-2005 National Conference Championship and the 2005-2006 BARLA National Cup Final, continuing to play at that level before accepting an offer from Warrington to play in their Senior Academy during 2007.

Ridyard returned once more to Leigh Miners Rangers and helped them win the 2008 League Leaders Trophy, scoring 231 points along the way, only for Miners to lose in the 2008 National Conference League Grand Final, though his season ended on a personal high by winning the highly coveted Player of the Season award.

Leigh Centurions
After a couple of false starts, Ridyard's professional career finally took off in 2009 when he re-joined hometown club Leigh Centurions, and quickly established himself as a first team regular.

A highly decorated player at amateur level, Ridyard has been capped by the BARLA Young Lions and GB Community Lions and has also represented Lancashire, before winning the first honour of his professional career when Leigh won the 2011 Northern Rail Cup Final. His second honour was being MOM in the 2013 Northern Rail Cup final win 2014 Leigh Centurions won the Kingston Press championship at Headingley, Martyn winning the Tom Bergin Trophy as MOM and also was voted Kingstone press player of the year.

Featherstone Rovers
In October 2017 he signed a two-year deal to play for Featherstone.

Leigh Centurions (return)
He returned to his home town club Leigh Centurions in 2018 for the 2019 season, although he spent most of 2020 out on loan at the Rochdale Hornets.

Swinton Lions
On 7 September 2020 it was announced that Ridyard would join the Swinton Lions for the 2021 season.

Oldham R.L.F.C.
On 22 Oct 2021 it was reported that he had signed for Oldham R.L.F.C. in the RFL League 1.

References

External links

Featherstone Rovers profile
Leigh Centurions profile
SL profile

1986 births
Living people
English rugby league players
Featherstone Rovers players
Huddersfield Giants players
Leigh Leopards players
Oldham R.L.F.C. captains
Oldham R.L.F.C. players
Rochdale Hornets players
Rugby league five-eighths
Rugby league halfbacks
Rugby league players from Leigh, Greater Manchester
Swinton Lions players